The 1947 Texas College Steers football team was an American football team that represented Texas College in the Southwestern Athletic Conference (SWAC) during the 1947 college football season. In their sixth season under head coach Alexander Durley, the team compiled a 5–2–3 record, 3–1–1 against conference opponents.  The team was ranked No. 16 among the nation's black college football teams according to the Pittsburgh Courier and its Dickinson Rating System.

Schedule

References

Texas College
Texas College Steers football seasons
Texas College Steers football